Kwazim Jude Keron Theodore (born 12 January 1996) is a Grenadian professional footballer who plays as a midfielder for the club Dunstable Town, and the Grenada national team.

International career
Theodore made his debut with the Grenada national team in 2–2 friendly tie with Trinidad and Tobago on 29 April 2017. He was called up to represent Grenada at the 2021 CONCACAF Gold Cup.

Personal life
On 11 April 2017, Theodore was one of 7 persons charged in an incident with the police in Grand Anse, Grenada. He was charged with obscene language, disorderly behavior, assault on police and obstruction, and released on bail.

References

External links
 
 

1996 births
Living people
Grenadian footballers
Grenada international footballers
Association football midfielders
Grenadian expatriate footballers
Grenadian expatriate sportspeople in Antigua and Barbuda
Expatriate footballers in Antigua and Barbuda
2021 CONCACAF Gold Cup players